Garners Creek is a  long 3rd order tributary to Pauls Creek in Carroll County, Virginia.

Course 
Garners Creek rises about 1 mile northeast of Sugarloaf Overlook in Carroll County and then flows southeast to join Pauls Creek about 1.5 miles northwest of Cana, Virginia.

Watershed 
Garners Creek drains  of area, receives about 53.3 in/year of precipitation, has a wetness index of 282.84, and is about 66% forested.

See also 
 List of Rivers of Virginia

References 

Rivers of Carroll County, Virginia
Rivers of Virginia